Eastern European Hockey League (EEHL) was a regional ice hockey league which existed from 1995 to 2004.

History
The league was formed in 1995 by Belarus, Latvia, Lithuania and Ukraine, to provide a higher-level competition for teams from those countries. In some years, the league also included teams from Poland and Russia. Besides the main tournament for professional ice hockey teams, the league also had junior championships in several age groups.

In 2004, it was dissolved. Instead, two teams from Latvia (Metalurgs Liepāja and Rīga 2000) and one team from Ukraine (Sokil Kyiv) joined the Belarusian Extraliga. There was temporarily a period where the Belarusian Extraliga was closed to foreign teams, but that has since changed as Metalurgs Liepāja, Dinamo/Juniors Rīga, and Sokil Kyiv became members of the league.

Teams of the last season (2003–04)
Division A
 HK Rīga 2000
 HK Metalurgs Liepāja
 ASK/Ogre
 Sokil Kyiv
 HK Neman Grodno
 Keramin Minsk
 HK Gomel
 Khimvolokno
 Titan Klin

Division B
 HK Vitebsk
 HK Kyiv
 Junior Minsk
 HK Gomel
 Riga 85
 Khimvolokno Mogilev

EEHL champions
1995–96:  HK Neman Grodno
1996–97:  Juniors Rīga
1997–98:  Sokil Kyiv
1998–99:  Sokil Kyiv
1999–00:  Berkut Kyiv
2000–01:  Berkut Kyiv
2001–02:  Metalurgs Liepāja
2002–03:  Keramin Minsk
2003–04:  Keramin Minsk

EEHL Cup winners
1997–98:  Sokil Kyiv
1998–99:  Sokil Kyiv
2000–01:  Berkut Kyiv
2003–04:  Titan Klin

External links
EEHL Playoffs (Russian)

  
Defunct multi-national ice hockey leagues in Europe
Sports leagues established in 1995
Ice hockey leagues in Belarus
Ice hockey leagues in Latvia
Ice hockey leagues in Lithuania
Ice hockey leagues in Poland
Defunct ice hockey leagues in Russia
Ice hockey leagues in Ukraine
Sports leagues disestablished in 2004
1995 establishments in Europe
2004 disestablishments in Europe